The Obelisk at Slottsbacken is an obelisk monument adjacent to the Royal Palace on Slottsbacken in Old Town, Stockholm, Sweden and is considered to be the very centre point of the Swedish capital city. Unveiled in 1800, it commemorates the deeds of Stockholm's citizenry during the Russo-Swedish War. In 2017, the original obelisk was dismantled due to age- and weather-related damage and was rebuilt, using newly quarried stone, in spring 2020.

Physical description
It weighed 150 tons and was made up of 17 different pieces of granite, believed to have been quarried in nearby Ulfsunda.

From the Obelisk all street numbers in Stockholm have their common origin - there are only a handful of exceptions, with some small streets originating from the street Birger Jarlsgatan.

History
The obelisk was commissioned by King Gustav III to show his gratitude to the burghers of Stockholm who guarded the city while the king was leading the Swedish-Finnish Navy in the Russian War in 1788-1790.

The neo-Egyptian design of the obelisk was made by the artist Louis Jean Desprez and it was erected by the inventor and colonel-mecanicus Jonas Lidströmer in 1800. The construction was at the time considered to be complicated, since the obelisk is made of many heavy stone boulders, and not cut from one piece as was typically done in  classical antiquity.

Gustav III died before the monument was finished, and in October 1800, King Gustav IV Adolf unveiled the obelisk.

2017–2020 replacement
By 2012, the obelisk was showing signs of significant deterioration and the area around the monument was fenced off to protect the public from possible falling stones. In 2017, the obelisk was dismantled and removed for repair and restoration work. The repairs were initially expected to take about a year, but it was later determined that the stones which make up the monument were so damaged they could not be repaired. It was decided to quarry new Bohus granite stones with similar technical and aesthetic properties from an area near Hunnebostrand. The shaft of the obelisk was rebuilt beginning in April 2020, with the final top piece installed 17 June 2020.
 
The new obelisk was processed by the stonemason Ted Zaar at the company Zaarstone in Vilshult. The granite - Tossene Grå Bohus - was delivered from one of Hallindens Granit's quarries.

References and notes

See also 

 List of streets and squares in Gamla stan
 History of Stockholm

Buildings and structures in Stockholm
Landmarks in Sweden
Obelisks